The Bettye Wilson Soccer Complex is a 10-field soccer complex located on   in Las Vegas, Nevada.  The facility is located adjacent to Cimarron-Memorial High School.  The complex is home to the Las Vegas Mayors Cup International Tournaments. The Las Vegas Mayors Cup is the nation's largest international soccer tournament.The complex is also the host for the Players College Showcase, the first college showcase tournament in the country.
Bettye Wilson Soccer Complex is named after Bettye Wilson.  Wilson was a pioneer in Las Vegas youth soccer and was responsible for creating Nevada's first girls' soccer league.

Professional teams 
Las Vegas Strikers, National Premier Soccer League (2003)
Las Vegas Tabagators, Women's Premier Soccer League (2005)

Notes

External links 
Bettye Wilson Soccer Complex

Soccer venues in Nevada
Sports venues in Las Vegas
Parks in Nevada
Defunct National Premier Soccer League stadiums
Sports complexes in the United States